Tramonti di Sotto (local variant Vildisot) is a comune (municipality) in the Province of Pordenone, in the Italian region of Friuli-Venezia Giulia.

Tramonti di Sotto borders the following municipalities: Castelnovo del Friuli, Clauzetto, Frisanco, Meduno, Preone, Socchieve, Tramonti di Sopra, Travesio, Verzegnis, Vito d'Asio.

Demographic evolution

References

Cities and towns in Friuli-Venezia Giulia